Entoleuca mammata is a species of fungus in the genus Entoleuca.  It is responsible for the plant disease hypoxylon canker in hardwood trees such as quaking aspen (Populus tremuloides) and other aspens and poplars, Salix myrsinifolia and other willow species,  rowan (Sorbus aucuparia), Sitka alder (Alnus viridis), birch (Betula spp.), apple (Malus spp.), oak (Quercus spp.), and hop-hornbeam (Ostrya spp.).

See also
Hypoxylon canker of shade trees

References

External links 

Entoleuca mammata in USDA ARS Fungal Database

Fungi described in 1996
Fungal tree pathogens and diseases
Xylariales